Alicia Fernández (born 25 November 1973) is a Spanish gymnast. She competed at the 1992 Summer Olympics where she placed 20th in the all around and fifth with the Spanish team.

References

External links
 

1973 births
Living people
Spanish female artistic gymnasts
Olympic gymnasts of Spain
Gymnasts at the 1992 Summer Olympics
Gymnasts from Madrid
20th-century Spanish women